Rick Titus may refer to:
 Rick Titus (journalist), former racing driver and automotive journalist
 Rick Titus (soccer) (born 1969), former soccer player and head coach